is a Japanese whisky distillery owned by the Kirin group.

It was established in 1972 by Kirin Seagram Ltd, now the Kirin Distillery Company.

Gotemba was selected as the site for the distillery because it was felt to have the climate most similar to Scotland: the city is much cooler and less humid (especially in summer) than other areas of Japan, with an average annual temperature of around 13°C.

References

External links

Fuji-Gotemba distillery – official site 
Fuji Gotemba whisky products – official site 

This article is based upon a translation of the French language version as at May 2014.

Distilleries in Japan
Japanese brands
Japanese whisky
Companies based in Shizuoka Prefecture
1972 establishments in Japan
ja:キリンディスティラリー